The India women's cricket team played South Africa women's cricket team in February 2018. The tour consisted of three Women's One Day Internationals (WODIs) and five Women's Twenty20 Internationals (WT20Is). The WODI games are part of the 2017–20 ICC Women's Championship. India Women won the WODI series 2–1. India Women won the WT20I series 3–1, after the fourth match was washed out.

Squads

Jhulan Goswami was ruled out of India's squad for the WT20I series due to a heel injury. Rumeli Dhar was added to India's squad as Goswami's replacement. Dhar last played international cricket for India in 2012.

WODI series

1st WODI

2nd WODI

3rd WODI

WT20I series

1st WT20I

2nd WT20I

3rd WT20I

4th WT20I

5th WT20I

References

External links
 Series home at ESPN Cricinfo

2017–20 ICC Women's Championship
International cricket competitions in 2017–18
2017–18 Indian women's cricket
South Africa 2018
Women's international cricket tours of South Africa
2018 in South African cricket
2018 in women's cricket
2018 in South African women's sport